Carperby-cum-Thoresby is a civil parish in the Richmondshire district of North Yorkshire, England. The parish contains the village of Carperby and the hamlets of High and Low Thoresby. The population at the 2011 Census by ONS was 200.

History

The village of Carperby is mentioned in the Domesday Book as Chirprebi. At the time of the Norman invasion the manor was the possession of Thor and afterwards granted to Enisant Musard by Count Alan of Brittany to whom it had been given by the Crown. Thereafter the lands became one of many feudal tenures that belonged to the constables of Richmond. The Lascelles family held the manor here during the 13th century, with the exception of a small area held by the Thoresby family after whom the hamlets in the parish are named. During the 14th century, the manor was tenured to the Wauton family of Masham and by 1421 had passed to the Scrope family of nearby Castle Bolton, whose descent it followed thereafter.

In the centre of Carperby there is a high-stepped cross dated 1674 indicating that Carperby once had a market. The charter for the market was granted in 1305 for weekly markets and fairs on St James' Day in July and St Andrew's Day in November. The Wheatsheaf Hotel was where James Herriot and his bride spent their honeymoon in 1941.

There was a Wesleyan Chapel erected here in 1826. The Friends Meeting House was erected in 1864 and signifies the importance of Quakerism in Wensleydale at that time. Both are now private residences. The village had a school for over 100 years until its closure in 1962.

The toponymy of Carperby is derived from the Old Norse personal name of Cairpe combined with bi to give the meaning of Cairpe's farm. The toponymy of Thoresby is derived from the Old Norse personal name of Thorir combined with bi to give the meaning of Thorir's farm.

Governance

The village lies within the Richmond UK Parliament constituency. It also lies within the Upper Dales electoral division of North Yorkshire County Council and the Bolton Castle ward of Hambleton District Council. The local Parish Council has five Councillors and a Parish Clerk.

Geography

The village of Carpeby is one mile north of Aysgarth. The Parish extends up the valley containing Belden Beck onto Carpeby and West Bolton Moors. Among the slopes can be found the remains of former lead mines and their tips. There are also many springs and shakeholes in the Parish. Near the village were two natural wells named St Matthew's Well and St James' Well, the former running dry in 1975 but the latter still providing water.

Demography

2001 census

The 2001 UK census showed that the population was split 46.4% male to 53.6% female. The religious constituency was made of 84.5% Christian and the rest stating no religion or not stating at all. The ethnic make-up was 98.6% White British and 1.5% Black British. There were 112 dwellings.

2011 census

The 2011 UK census showed that the population was split 48% male to 52% female. The religious constituency was made of 65% Christian and the rest stating no religion or not stating at all. The ethnic make-up was 99.5% White British and 0.5% each Mixed Ethnic. There were 126 dwellings.

References

Civil parishes in North Yorkshire